Matīss is a Latvian  given name and surname. It is the Latvian form of Matthew. People with the name include:

 Matīss Akuraters (born 1982), Latvian percussionist
 Matīss Kivlenieks (1996–2021), Latvian ice hockey goaltender
 Matīss Burģis (born 1989), Latvian table tennis player
 Anrijs Matīss (born 1973), Latvian politician and former Minister for Transport of Latvia

Latvian masculine given names
Latvian-language masculine surnames